Kalar (also Romanized as Kalār; also known as Kal’var and Kolvār) is a village in Sanjabad-e Sharqi Rural District, in the Central District of Khalkhal County, Ardabil Province, Iran. At the 2006 census, its population was 65, in 15 families.

References 

Tageo

Towns and villages in Khalkhal County